Supriyadi is an Indonesian surname. Notable people with the surname include:

 Mochammad Supriadi (born 2002), Indonesian football player
 Tedi Supriadi (born 1996), Indonesian badminton player

See also
Supriyadi

Indonesian-language surnames